Qerim is a village in the District of Gjakova, Kosovo.

Notes and references

Notes

References

Villages in Gjakova